Tuéjar is a municipality in the comarca of Los Serranos in the Valencian Community, Spain.

External links 
 Tuéjar Town Hall official site
 El rincón tuejano
 Institut Valencià d'Estadística.
 Portal de la Direcció General d'Administració Local de la Generalitat.

References

Municipalities in the Province of Valencia
Los Serranos